Quenstedt is a village in Saxony-Anhalt, Germany.

Quenstedt may also refer to:

In places:
 Groß Quenstedt, a municipality in Saxony-Anhalt, Germany

In people:
 Friedrich August von Quenstedt, a German geologist and palaeontologist
 Johannes Andreas Quenstedt, a German  Lutheran dogmatician